Lysiak or Łysiak is a surname of Polish-language origin. Notable people with the surname include:
 Hilde Lysiak (born 2006), American journalist
 Ivan Lysiak-Rudnytsky (1919–1984), Ukrainian historian
 Krystyna Łysiak, Polish para table tennis player
 Paweł Łysiak (born 1996), Polish football player
 Tom Lysiak (1953–2016), Canadian ice hockey player
 Waldemar Łysiak (born 1944), Polish author

See also

References

Polish-language surnames